Renato Zangheri (8 April 1925 – 6 August 2015) was an Italian politician who was Mayor of Bologna from 1970 to 1983.

Biography 
Zangheri graduated in Philosophy from the University of Bologna and later taught at the same University and at the University of Trieste.

City councilor of Mayor 
He joined the Italian Communist Party in 1944 and was elected for the first time to the city council of Bologna in 1956. In 1970, Zangheri was elected Mayor of Bologna and guided the city throughout the difficult Years of Lead (Anni di piombo): during those years, the city faced several fascist attacks, such as the Italicus Express bombing, the murder of activist Francesco Lorusso and the 1980 massacre at Bologna railway station.

Deputy 
Zangheri left his office when he was elected to the Chamber of Deputies at the 1983 general election, being re-elected four years later. From 1986 to 1990, Zangheri was the group leader of the Italian Communist Party in the Chamber of Deputies.

Later life and death 
In 1991, Zangheri returned to teaching and was Rector of the University of the Republic of San Marino.

He lived in Imola until he died on 6 August 2015, at the age of 90.

References

External links 
Files about his parliamentary activities (in Italian): IX, X legislature

1925 births
2015 deaths
People from Rimini
Italian Communist Party politicians
Democratic Party of the Left politicians
Democrats of the Left politicians
Democratic Party (Italy) politicians
20th-century Italian politicians
21st-century Italian politicians
Mayors of Bologna